Lulu is a 1917 German silent film directed by Alexander Antalffy and starring Erna Morena, Adolf Klein and Harry Liedtke.

The film's art direction was by Kurt Richter.

Plot
The circus dancer Lulu is a thoroughly liberal being. Although she loves her former savior, the clown Alfredo, she begins a relationship with the noble Henri von Reithofen. Henri kills himself, ruined by the horrendous expenses for Lulu.

Cast
 Erna Morena as Lulu  
 Adolf Klein as Robert von Waldheim  
 Harry Liedtke as Rudolf von Waldheim  
 Rolf Brunner as Henri  
 Emil Jannings as Alfredo, a clown

References

Bibliography
 Isenberg, Noah William. Weimar Cinema: An Essential Guide to Classic Films of the Era. Columbia University Press, 2009.

External links

1917 films
Films based on works by Frank Wedekind
Films of the German Empire
Films directed by Alexander Antalffy
German silent feature films
German black-and-white films
1910s German films